In mathematics, and especially algebraic geometry, a Bridgeland stability condition, defined by Tom Bridgeland, is an algebro-geometric stability condition defined on elements of a triangulated category. The case of original interest and particular importance is when this derived category is the derived category of coherent sheaves on a Calabi–Yau manifold, and this situation has fundamental links to string theory and the study of D-branes.

Such stability conditions were introduced in a rudimentary form by Michael Douglas called -stability and used to study BPS B-branes in string theory. This concept was made precise by Bridgeland, who phrased these stability conditions categorically, and initiated their study mathematically.

Definition
The definitions in this section are presented as in the original paper of Bridgeland, for arbitrary triangulated categories. Let  be a triangulated category.

Slicing of triangulated categories 
  for all , where  is the shift functor on the triangulated category,
 for every object  there exists a finite sequence of real numbers  and a collection of triangles

The last property should be viewed as axiomatically imposing the existence of Harder–Narasimhan filtrations on elements of the category .

Stability conditions 
 if  then  for some strictly positive real number .

It is convention to assume the category  is essentially small, so that the collection of all stability conditions on  forms a set . In good circumstances, for example when  is the derived category of coherent sheaves on a complex manifold , this set actually has the structure of a complex manifold itself.

Technical remarks about stability condition 
It is shown by Bridgeland that the data of a Bridgeland stability condition is equivalent to specifying a bounded t-structure  on the category  and a central charge  on the heart  of this t-structure which satisfies the Harder–Narasimhan property above.

Examples

From the Harder–Narasimhan filtration 
Recall the Harder–Narasimhan filtration for a smooth projective curve  implies for any coherent sheaf  there is a filtrationsuch that the factors  have slope .

Elliptic curves 
There is an analysis by Bridgeland for the case of Elliptic curves.

References

Papers 

 Stability conditions on  singularities
 Interactions between autoequivalences, stability conditions, and moduli problems

Geometry
String theory
Algebraic geometry